Jeff Ward (November 18, 1962 – March 19, 1993) was an American musician, serving as a drummer for various rock bands including Skafish, Hammeron, Nine Inch Nails, Revolting Cocks, Ministry, Lard (Drums and Vocals), and Low Pop Suicide.

He committed suicide by carbon monoxide poisoning in 1993. Revolting Cocks' 1993 album Linger Ficken' Good, Nine Inch Nails' 1994 album The Downward Spiral, Ministry's 1996 album Filth Pig, and Lard's 1997 release Pure Chewing Satisfaction all featured dedications to him, while Ward's friend (and Nine Inch Nails bandmate) Richard Patrick dealt with his death in the Filter track "It's Over." He probably provided vocals and drums for 1000 Homo DJs.

References

External links

Article Regarding Death and Tribute Concert originally printed May 6, 1993 in the Chicago Sun-Times

1962 births
1993 deaths
American industrial musicians
Nine Inch Nails members
Suicides by carbon monoxide poisoning
Lard (band) members
20th-century American drummers
American male drummers
1993 suicides
20th-century American male musicians
Suicides in the United States
Pigface members

sv:Jeff Ward